3490 or variant, may refer to:

In general
 A.D. 3490, a year in the 4th millennium CE
 3490 BC, a year in the 4th millennium BCE
 3490, a number in the 3000 (number) range

Other uses
 3490 storage tape format, from the IBM 3480 Family
 3490 Šolc, an asteroid in the Asteroid Belt, the 3490th asteroid registered
 Texas Farm to Market Road 3490, a state highway

See also